This is an alphabetical list of notable Azad Kashmiris.

A 
 Abdul Hamid Khan
 Abdul Rahman Khan
 Abdul Rashid Abbasi
 Abdur Rasheed Turabi
 Adil Rashid
 Afaq Raheem
 Amjad Ali Chaudhri
 Arsalan Arif
 Asrar
 Attique Ahmed Khan
 Aziz Khan

B 
 Baba Shadi Shaheed

C 
 Chaudhry Abdul Majid
 Chauhdry Abdul Rashid

D 
 D. P. Roy Choudhury

F 
 Farooq Haider Khan

G 
 Ghulam Ahmad
 Ghulam-us-Saqlain Naqvi

I 
 Ilyas Kashmiri
 Imran Arif
 Imtiaz Abbasi
 Irfan Sabir
 Irfan Talib

K 
 Khalid Ibrahim Khan
 Khan Muhammad Khan

M 
 Masood Khan
 Mian Muhammad Bakhsh
 Matloob Inkalabi
 Michael Masih
 Mohammed Ajeeb
 Moeen Ali
 Muhammad Abdul Qayyum Khan
 Muhammad Anwar Khan
 Muhammad Yaqoob Khan

N 
 Nazir Ahmed, Baron Ahmed

Q 
 Qamar Zaman Khan
 Qurban Hussain

R 
 Raja Muhammad Zulqarnain Khan
 Rashid Naseer

S 
 Saif Ali Janjua
 Salman Irshad
 Sayab Khalid
 Sepoy Maqbool Hussain
 Shabir Choudhry
 Sikandar Hayat Khan
 Sultan Muzaffar Khan

T 
 Tabarak Dar

See also
 Azad Kashmiri diaspora

 
Azad Kashmir-related lists